The Thrill of It All may refer to:

Films:
The Thrill of It All (film), a 1963 film starring Doris Day and James Garner.

Albums:
The Thrill of It All (Roxy Music album), 1995
The Thrill of It All (Thunder album), 1996
The Thrill of It All (Sam Smith album), 2017

Songs:
"The Thrill of It All" (song), a song by Roxy Music from Country Life
"The Thrill of It All", a song by Black Sabbath from Sabotage